Salih Dursun (born 12 July 1991) is a Turkish footballer who plays as a right back and defensive midfielder for Süper Lig club Fatih Karagümrük.

Club career
Dursun made his Süper Lig debut on 27 August 2012. Though he wasn't a particularly well-known player until 21 February 2016, he gained fame on that date after he showed the red card to referee Deniz Ateş Bitnel in an effort to protest the dismissal of his teammate Luis Pedro Cavanda in a match against Galatasaray. He himself was sent off following the act. While his extreme reaction received mixed feedback from the media and football fans alike, it was highly appreciated in the city of Trabzon, to the extent of having a street renamed after him.

Career statistics
.

Honours
Galatasaray
Türkiye Kupası: 2013–14

References

External links
 Salih Dursun at TFF.org
 
 

1991 births
Living people
Sportspeople from Adapazarı
Turkish footballers
Turkey B international footballers
Kayserispor footballers
Süper Lig players
TFF First League players
Association football midfielders
Galatasaray S.K. footballers
Trabzonspor footballers
Antalyaspor footballers
Gençlerbirliği S.K. footballers